Granville Station may refer to:

 Granville station (CTA), a station on Chicago Transit Authority's Red Line
 Granville station (SkyTrain), a SkyTrain station on the Expo Line in Metro Vancouver, Canada
 Granville railway station, on Sydney's Sydney Trains network
 Granville Street railway station, a former station in Birmingham on what was the West Suburban Railway, now the Cross City Line
 Granville station (Manche), Granville, Manche, France